Collegium Invisibile is an academic society founded in 1995 in Warsaw that affiliates outstanding Polish students in the humanities and science with distinguished scholars in accordance with the idea of a liberal education. The association aims at offering young scholars the opportunity to participate in original research projects as well as exclusive individual master-student cooperation through the tutorial system based on methods used at the Oxbridge universities.

Collegium has its roots in the tradition of the eighteenth century Collegium Nobilium, an elite high school founded in 1740, one of the predecessors of the University of Warsaw.  Traditionally, the rector of the university is ex officio chairman of the science board of the Collegium.

Each year about twenty Polish students who have succeeded in passing a stringent admission procedure are granted membership of Collegium and thus receive an opportunity to follow an individually chosen path of academic study.

Tutors
Students choose scholars with whom they would like cooperate. The scholars are then invited to become fellows of the Collegium.

Fellows

Jan Błoński
Leszek Balcerowicz
Bronisław Geremek 
Jerzy Jarniewicz
Jacek Jastrzębski
Ewa Łętowska
Aleksander Gieysztor
Hanna Gronkiewicz-Waltz
Jerzy Jedlicki
Jerzy Kłoczowski
Monika Kostera
Andrzej Koźmiński
Ryszard Legutko
Philippe Lejeune
Andrzej Olechowski
Zbigniew Pełczyński
Wojciech Roszkowski
Marek Safjan
Marek Siemek
Paweł Śpiewak
Józef Tischner
Ewa Wipszycka

Source:

References

External links
Official website

 
Student organisations in Poland
Universities and colleges in Poland
Learned societies of Poland
1995 establishments in Poland
Organizations established in 1995